Weekend at the Asylum (commonly shortened to just The Asylum) is likely the largest and longest running steampunk festival in the world. Since 2009, the festival (or convivial in steampunk parlance) has been held each year in Lincoln and currently stretches over multiple venues in the historic cathedral quarter of Lincoln town, Lincoln Castle and Bishop Grosseteste University. It is run as a not-for-profit event organised by the now Ministry of Steampunk, previously the Victorian Steampunk Society.

It combines four full days of features, classes, craft workshops and entertainment, such as the Empire Ball, Majors Review (The Major's Soiree) and the International Tea Duelling final, along with live music, comedy acts and the largest steampunk market in the world referred to as the Bazaar Eclectica.

2009 festival

The 2009 festival was held between Friday 11 and Sunday 13 September at The Lawn (the former Lincoln Lunatic Asylum) and was attended by 432 steampunks.

2010 festival

The 2010 festival was held between Friday 10 and Sunday 12 September in The Lawn and Bailgate area.  It included concerts, book signings and a market and was attended by almost a thousand steampunks.

2011 festival

The 2011 festival was held between Friday 9 and Sunday 11 September and attracted more than a thousand steampunks from across the World. Still based mainly in the Lawn and Bailgate area this year also included various events in Lincoln Castle including the Bazaar Eclectica being run from the old Victorian prison and an attempt to unofficially break the record for the most steampunks gathered in one place.  The success of this year resulted in the convention being called the Best International Convention in the Steampunk Chronicle Readers Awards in April 2012.

2012 festival

The 2012 festival was held between Friday 14 and Sunday 16 September and was the first to no longer include The Lawn as a venue due to its being sold by the City of Lincoln Council earlier in the year.

2013 festival

The 2013 festival was held between Friday 13 and Sunday 15 September, it was attended by close to 2000 steampunks.

2014 festival

The 2014 festival was held between Friday 12 and Sunday 14 September and was attended by over 2000 steampunks.

2015 festival

The 2015 festival was the first to stretch over 4 days and was held between Friday 28th and Monday 31st, it was attended by thousands of steampunks  and stretched across the cathedral quarter, castle and Bailgate area.

2016 festival

The 2016 festival was held between Thursday 25th and Monday 29th and included venues across the cathedral quarter, castle, Bailgate area, Bishop Grosseteste University and the University of Lincoln.  This festival featured the UK debut of steampunk themed folk rock band Steam Powered Giraffe at Time Travelers.

Notable guests

Musicians and bands

Magicians

Dancers and dancing groups

Authors and artists

Comedians
 Andrew O'Neill

2017 festival

The 2017 festival was held between the evening of Thursday 24th and Monday 28th.  Organisers claim it was attended by between 35,000 and 40,000 people a day.

Notable guests

Musicians and bands

Magicians

Dancers and dancing groups

Authors and artists

Comedians
 Marc Burrows
 Dr Cornelius Porridge

2018 festival

The 2018 festival was held between Friday 24th and Monday 27 August.

2019 festival

The 2019 festival was held between Friday 23rd and Monday 26 August.

2022 festival

The 2022 festival was held between the evening of Thursday 25th and Monday 29 August.

References

Steampunk conventions